The Sandy Second Ward Chapel (formerly known as the Berean Baptist Church and the Anchor Baptist Church) is a location in Sandy, Utah listed on the National Register of Historic Places.  It was designed by the architect Don Carlos Young, a son of Brigham Young.  It was later sold by the Church of Jesus Christ of Latter-day Saints.

It is built of dark maroon brick on a concrete foundation.  A parapet mostly hides the building's low roof.  It has
four Tuscan columns made of granite-like cast aggregate at its front entrance.

References

20th-century Latter Day Saint church buildings
Former churches in Utah
Former Latter Day Saint religious buildings and structures
Meetinghouses of the Church of Jesus Christ of Latter-day Saints in Utah
Religious buildings and structures in Salt Lake County, Utah
Properties of religious function on the National Register of Historic Places in Utah
Churches completed in 1921
Buildings and structures in Sandy, Utah
National Register of Historic Places in Salt Lake County, Utah
1921 establishments in Utah
Individually listed contributing properties to historic districts on the National Register in Utah